Thurman Green (August 12, 1940 – June 19, 1997) was an American jazz trombonist. He was a member of the Horace Tapscott Quintet and the Clayton-Hamilton Jazz Orchestra.

Green and Hamiet Bluiett were at the Navy School of Music together in 1962. More than thirty years later, Bluiett produced and performed on Green's only album as a leader, Dance of the Night Creatures on Mapleshade Records. They began recording in 1994, and Green died in 1997 at the age of 57. Mapleshade released the album in 1999.

Discography
 Cross Current (B.J. Records, 1988) as Thurman Green Trio
 Dance of the Night Creatures (Mapleshade, 1999)

As sideman
With Gerald Wilson
 Live and Swinging (Pacific Jazz, 1967)
 Everywhere (Pacific Jazz, 1968)
 California Soul (Pacific Jazz, 1968)
 Eternal Equinox (Pacific Jazz, 1969)
 Lomelin (Discovery, 1981)
 Jessica (Trend, 1982)
 Calafia (Trend, 1985)
 Jenna (Discovery, 1989)
 State Street Sweet (MAMA, 1995)

With Clayton-Hamilton Jazz Orchestra 
 1990 Groove Shop
 1991 Heart and Soul 
 1995 Absolutely!

With others
 1969 Electric Connection,  Jean-Luc Ponty
 1971 Things Ain't What They Used to Be (And You Better Believe It),  Ella Fitzgerald 
 1972 Ethiopian Knights, Donald Byrd
 1974 Adam's Apple, Doug Carn
 1975 Inner Glow, Bobby Hutcherson 
 1977 Tomorrow Is Here, Willie Bobo 
 1980 California Message, Benny Golson
 1984 The Poet II, Bobby Womack
 1987 Before My Time, Lol Coxhill
 1987 E-bone-ix, Buster Cooper
 1987 Tribute to Count Basie, Gene Harris
 1989 Boogie Down, Ernestine Anderson
 1990 Rhythm, Blues Soul & Grooves, Bobby King
 1991 Dingo, Miles Davis and Michel Legrand
 1991 Unforgettable, Natalie Cole
 1993 Blue Saxophone, Teddy Edwards
 1995 Afterglow, Dr. John
 1995 In a Hefti Bag, Frank Capp
 1996 Their Time Was the Greatest, Louie Bellson

References

1940 births
1997 deaths
Bebop trombonists
American jazz trombonists
Male trombonists
20th-century American musicians
20th-century trombonists
20th-century American male musicians
American male jazz musicians
Clayton-Hamilton Jazz Orchestra members